Center Point is an unincorporated community in Worcester Township, Montgomery County, Pennsylvania, United States at the junction of Routes 73 and 363. It is drained by the Zacharias Creek westward into the Skippack Creek, a tributary of the Perkiomen Creek. The community is served by the Methacton School District and by the Collegeville, Lansdale, and Norristown post offices, with the zip codes of 19426, 19446, and 19403, respectively.

References

Unincorporated communities in Montgomery County, Pennsylvania
Unincorporated communities in Pennsylvania